Resident Advisors may refer to:
 Resident assistant, a supervisor in a group housing facility
 Resident Advisor, an online music magazine
 Resident Advisors (TV series), an American comedy series